The men's canoe sprint C-1 200 metres competition at the 2016 Olympic Games in Rio de Janeiro took place between 17 and 18 August at Lagoa Stadium.

The medals were presented by José Perurena López, IOC member, Spain and Tim Cornish, Board Member of the ICF.

It was the last appearance of the men's C-1 200 metres. The men's C-1 200 metres and men's K-2 200 metres were replaced with women's C-1 200 metres and women's C-2 500 metres as part of the Olympics' move towards gender equality.

Format

The competition comprised heats, semifinals, and a final round.  The leading five in each heat plus the fastest sixth place advanced to the semifinals. The top two from each of the three semifinals plus the two best third-place times advanced to the "A" final, and competed for medals. The next eight fastest advanced to the "B" final.

Schedule

All times are Brasilia Time (UTC-03:00)

Results

Heats
The leading five in each heat plus the fastest sixth place advanced to the semifinals.

Heat 1

Heat 2

Heat 3

Heat 4

Semifinals
The top two from each of the semifinals plus the two best third-place times advanced to the "A" final. The next eight fastest advanced to the "B" final.

Semifinal 1

Semifinal 2

Semifinal 3

Finals

Final B

Final A

References

Canoeing at the 2016 Summer Olympics
Men's events at the 2016 Summer Olympics